This is the timeline of the Mongol Empire from the birth of Temüjin, later Genghis Khan, to the ascension of Kublai Khan as emperor of the Yuan dynasty in 1271, though the title of Khagan continued to be used by the Yuan rulers into the Northern Yuan dynasty, a far less powerful successor entity, until 1634.

12th century

1160s

1170s

1180s

1190s

13th century

1200s

1210s

1220s

1230s

1240s

1250s

1260s

1270s

Gallery

See also
Timeline of the Golden Horde
Timeline of the Chagatai Khanate
Timeline of the Ilkhanate
Timeline of the Yuan dynasty
Timeline of Mongolian history

References

Citations

Sources

 .

 (alk. paper) 
 

 

  (paperback).
 

 
 .

 

 
 

 

 

 

 
  
 

 
 

History of the Mongol Empire